Siah Kol (also Romanized as Sīāh Kol; also known as Sīāh Gol) is a village in Sar Firuzabad Rural District, Firuzabad District, Kermanshah County, Kermanshah Province, Iran. At the 2006 census, its population was 204, in 44 families.

References 

Populated places in Kermanshah County